Motown Gold is a set of compilation albums released by the Tamla Motown label. The first album released in 1975, was a top 10 hit in the UK, where it charted for 35 weeks, whilst Vol. 2 (1977) reached the top 30.

Track listing

Motown Gold

Charts

Motown Gold

Motown Gold Vol. 2

Certifications

Motown Gold

Motown Gold Vol. 2

References

Tamla Records compilation albums
1975 compilation albums